William Balikwisha (born 12 May 1999) is a professional footballer who plays as a midfielder for Standard Liège. Born in Belgium, he represents the DR Congo internationally.

Club career
Balikwisha joined Anderlecht's youth academy at the age of 4, and moved to Standard Liège in 2014. Balikwisha made his professional debut for Standard in a 3-0 Belgian First Division A win over Lokeren on 18 August 2018.
On 9 August 2019, he joined Cercle Brugge on a one season loan.

International career
Born in Belgium, Balikwisha is of Congolese descent. Balikwisha represented the DR Congo U23s for a pair of 2019 Africa U-23 Cup of Nations qualification matches in March 2019.

Personal life
Balikwisha is the brother of the footballer Michel-Ange Balikwisha.

References

External links
 
 Standard Profile
 RTBF Profile

1999 births
Living people
Citizens of the Democratic Republic of the Congo through descent
Democratic Republic of the Congo footballers
Belgian footballers
Belgian expatriate footballers
Belgian sportspeople of Democratic Republic of the Congo descent
R.S.C. Anderlecht players
Standard Liège players
Cercle Brugge K.S.V. players
MVV Maastricht players
Belgian Pro League players
Eerste Divisie players
Association football wingers
Belgian expatriate sportspeople in the Netherlands
Expatriate footballers in the Netherlands
Challenger Pro League players
SL16 FC players